"Everything Is Fine" is a song written and recorded by American country music artist Josh Turner.  It was released in August 2008 as the third single and title track from his album Everything Is Fine.

Content
"Everything Is Fine" is a mid-tempo in which the narrator lists off the various occurrences in and observations of his everyday life, such as his house, job, and family. He expresses a sense of satisfaction with his life in general, saying that he's "feeling good and everything is fine."

Critical reception
The song received a "thumbs up" rating from the country music site Engine 145. Reviewer Matt C. says that it is "much easier to sing about being country when the song actually sounds country."

Music video
The music video was directed by Roman White and premiered in November 2008.

Chart performance
The song debuted at number 52 on the U.S. Billboard Hot Country Songs chart for the week of September 6, 2008.

References

2008 singles
Josh Turner songs
MCA Nashville Records singles
Song recordings produced by Frank Rogers (record producer)
Music videos directed by Roman White
Songs written by Josh Turner
2007 songs